The Louis Néel Medal has been awarded annually since 1994 by the European Geophysical Society (EGS), usually for magnetism, palaeomagnetism and petrophysics, and is named after the Nobel Laureate Louis Néel, known for his research in the field of magnetism. It is awarded for outstanding contributions in the application of experimental and theoretical methods of solid state physics to the study of earth sciences.

Medallists 
Source:

See also

 List of geology awards
 List of geophysics awards
 List of physics awards

References

External links
Official Website

Physics awards
Geology awards
Awards established in 1994
1994 establishments in Germany